Saqal Tuli (also Romanized as Saqal Tūlī and Saqqal Tūlī; also known as Saghltooli and Sakaltuli) is a village in Mojezat Rural District, in the Central District of Zanjan County, Zanjan Province, Iran. At the 2006 census, its population was 122, in 30 families.

References 

Populated places in Zanjan County